Twin Mountain is a mountain located in Greene County, New York. 
The mountain is part of the Devil's Path range of the Catskill Mountains.
To the northwest, Twin Mtn. is separated from Sugarloaf Mountain by Pecoy Notch; to the southeast, Twin Mtn. is separated from Indian Head Mountain by Jimmy Dolan Notch.

Twin Mountain stands within the watershed of the Hudson River, which drains into New York Bay. 
The northwest end and northeast side of Twin Mtn. drain into the headwaters of Schoharie Creek, thence into the Mohawk River, and the Hudson River. 
The southeast end of Twin Mtn. drains into Saw Kill, thence into Esopus Creek, and the Hudson River. 
The southwest side of Twin drains into Beaver Kill, thence into Esopus Creek.

Twin Mountain is contained within New York's Catskill State Park.
The Devil's Path hiking trail traverses the summit ridge of Twin. 

Notes

See also 
 List of mountains in New York

External links 
 Twin Mountain Hiking Info Catskill 3500 Clu
  Peakbagger.com: Twin Mountain
 

Mountains of Greene County, New York
Catskill High Peaks